Sieber is a German surname. Notable people with the surname include:

 Al Sieber (1843–1907), German-American chief of scouts
 Bodo Sieber (born 1979), German rugby player
 Caroline Sieber (born 1982), Austrian fashion stylist
 Christoph Sieber (born 1971), Austrian sailor
 Christopher Sieber (born 1969), American actor
 Ernst Sieber (1927–2018), Swiss pastor and politician
 Fiona Sieber (born 2000), German chess master
 Franz Sieber (1789–1844), German botanist
 Josef Sieber (1900-1962), German film actor
 Lothar Sieber (1922–1945), German test pilot

German-language surnames
Surnames from given names